Wind power is a branch of the energy industry that has expanded quickly in the United States over the last several years. From January through December 2021, 379.8 terawatt-hours were generated by wind power, or 9.23% of electricity in the United States. The average wind turbine generates enough electricity in 46 minutes to power the average American home for one month. In 2019, wind power surpassed hydroelectric power as the largest renewable energy source in the U.S.

As of January 2022, the total installed wind power nameplate generating capacity in the United States was 135,843 megawatts (MW). This capacity is exceeded only by China and the European Union. Thus far, wind power's largest growth in capacity was in 2020, when 16,913 MW of wind power was installed. Following behind it were 2021, during which 13,365 MW were installed, and 2012, which saw the addition of 11,895 MW, representing 26.5% of the new power capacity installed during that year.

By September 2019, 19 states had over 1,000 MW of installed capacity with five states (Texas, Iowa, Oklahoma, Kansas, and California), generating over half of all wind energy in the nation. Texas, with 28,843 MW of capacity, about 16.8% of the state's electricity usage, had the most installed wind power capacity of any U.S. state at the end of 2019. Texas also had more under construction than any other state currently has installed. The state generating the highest percentage of energy from wind power is Iowa at over 57% of total energy production, while North Dakota has the most per capita wind generation.

The Alta Wind Energy Center in California is the largest wind farm in the United States with a capacity of 1,548 MW. GE Power is the largest domestic wind turbine manufacturer.

History 

The first municipal use of multiple wind-electric turbines in the USA may have been a five turbine system in Pettibone, North Dakota in 1940. These were commercial Wincharger units on guyed towers.

In 1980 the world's first wind farm, consisting of twenty 30 kW wind turbines was installed at Crotched Mountain, in New Hampshire.

From 1974 through the mid-1980s the United States government worked with industry to advance the technology and enable large commercial wind turbines. A series of NASA wind turbines were developed under a program to create a utility-scale wind turbine industry in the U.S., with funding from the National Science Foundation and later the United States Department of Energy (DOE). A total of 13 experimental wind turbines were put into operation, in four major wind turbine designs. This research and development program pioneered many of the multi-megawatt turbine technologies in use today, including: steel tube towers, variable-speed generators, composite blade materials, partial-span pitch control, as well as aerodynamic, structural, and acoustic engineering design capabilities.

Later, in the 1980s, California provided tax rebates for wind power. These rebates funded the first major use of wind power for utility electric power. These machines, gathered in large wind parks such as at Altamont Pass would be considered small and un-economic by modern wind power development standards. In 1985 half of the world's wind energy was generated at Altamont Pass. By the end of 1986 about 6,700 wind turbines, mostly less than 100 kW, had been installed at Altamont, at a cost of about $1 billion, and generated about 550 GWh/year.

Largest wind farms 

Currently, the ten largest wind farms in the United States are:

Economics 
The 2020 report on energy costs by Lazard found that the unsubsidized levelized cost of energy (LCOE) for onshore wind is 2.6 to 5.4 cents per kilowatt-hour (kWh), and the median unsubsidized LCOE for offshore wind is 8.6 cents per kWh.
In comparison, the analysis finds that the lowest-cost conventional source, Gas Combined Cycle, has a cost range of 4.4 to 7.3 cents per kwh.

In 2021, the United States Energy Information Administration estimated that the unsubsidized, levelized cost of new onshore wind energy entering service in 2023 will be 3 cents per kwh.
The report also cautioned that levelized costs can be misleading.  While levelized cost reflects the cost of building and operating a power plant, it does not recognize the relative value of energy from dispatchable sources such as gas turbine compared to non-dispatchable sources such as wind farms.  The report also calculates levelized avoided cost of energy (LACE), which can be used to better reflect the economic value of an energy source.

Subsidies such as the investment tax credit and production tax credit further reduce the current cost of wind energy. These subsidies are scheduled to decline and expire in the coming years.

In 2015, Utah State University published a Koch-funded study

stating that the cost of wind energy is higher than most cost estimates calculate. The American Wind Energy Association has criticized the study of lacking comparison with pollution and subsidies incurred by other electric power sources, and for counting transmission as a cost rather than a benefit.

Renewable portfolio standards require renewable energy to exist (most of them intermittent such as wind and solar), but at the expense of utilities and consumers. Subsidizing this with production tax credits makes wind power cheaper for utilities and consumers, but at the expense of taxpayers.

National trends

Production 

As of 2021, the United States has over 135 GW of installed wind power capacity. Wind power has increased dramatically over the past years. In 2010, however, newly installed generating capacity was about half of the previous year due to various factors, including the financial crisis, and recession. In 2013 there was a 92% reduction in newly installed generating capacity compared to 2012, due to the late extension of the PTC (see image on the right). The graph at left shows the growth in installed wind generation capacity in the United States based on data from the Office of Energy Efficiency and Renewable Energy. In 2008, installed capacity in the U.S. increased by 50% over the prior year. The world average growth rate that year was 28.8%.

By 2014, the wind industry in the USA was able to produce more power at lower cost by using taller wind turbines with longer blades, capturing the faster winds at higher elevations. Prices had fallen to about 4 cents per kilowatt-hour in some cases and utilities had been increasing the amount of wind energy in their portfolio, saying it is their cheapest option. For power contracts made in the year 2014, the average price of wind power fell to 2.5¢/kWh.

The capacity factor is the ratio of power actually produced divided by the nameplate capacity of the turbines. The overall average capacity factor for wind generation in the US increased from 31.7% in 2008, to 32.3% in 2013.

Wind generation potential 
According to the National Renewable Energy Laboratory, the contiguous United States has the potential for
10,459 GW of onshore wind power. The capacity could generate 37 petawatt-hours (PW·h) annually, an amount nine times larger than current total U.S. electricity consumption. The U.S. also has large wind resources in Alaska, and Hawaii.

In addition to the large onshore wind resources, the U.S. has large offshore wind power potential, with another NREL report released in September 2010 showing that the U.S. has 4,150 GW of potential offshore wind power nameplate capacity, an amount 4 times that of the country's 2008 installed capacity from all sources, of 1,010 GW. Some experts estimate that the entire East Coast could be powered by offshore wind farms.

The U.S. Department of Energy's 2008 report 20% Wind Energy by 2030 envisioned that wind power could supply 20% of all U.S. electric power, which included a contribution of 4% to the nation's total electric power from offshore wind power. In order to achieve this, however, significant advances in cost, performance and reliability are needed, based on a 2011 report from a coalition of researchers from universities, industry, and government, supported by the Atkinson Center for a Sustainable Future. Obtaining 20% from wind requires about 305 GW of wind turbines, an increase of 16 GW/year after 2018, or an average increase of 14.6%/year, and transmission line improvements. Analysts estimate around 25 GW of added US wind power in 2016–18, depending on the Clean Power Plan and PTC extensions. After the current PTC phase-out in 2021, additional wind power capacity is expected to be around 5 GW per year.

Wind power by state 

In 2019, electric power generation from wind power was 10 percent or more in fourteen U.S. states: Colorado, Idaho, Iowa, Kansas, Maine, Minnesota, North Dakota, Oklahoma, Oregon, South Dakota, Vermont, Nebraska, New Mexico, and Texas.
Iowa, South Dakota, North Dakota, Oklahoma, and Kansas each had more than 20 percent of their electric power generation come from wind. Twenty states now have more than five percent of their generation coming from wind. Iowa became the first state in the nation to generate 50% of its electricity from wind power in 2020, as predicted in 2015.

The five states with the most wind capacity installed at the end of 2020 were:

 Texas (33,133 MW)
 Iowa (11,660 MW)
 Oklahoma (9,048 MW)
 Kansas (7,016 MW)
 Illinois (6,409 MW)

The top five states according to percentage of generation by wind in 2020 were:

 Iowa (57.5%)
 Kansas (43.3%)
 Oklahoma (35.4%)
 South Dakota (32.9%)
 North Dakota (30.8%)

Texas 

In July 2008, Texas approved a $4.93 billion expansion of the state's electric grid to bring wind energy to its major cities from western areas of the state. Transmission companies will recoup the cost of constructing the new power lines, expected to be completed in 2013, from fees estimated at $4 per month for residential customers. A lack of transmission capacity forced wind turbines to be shut down at times and reduced wind power generation in Texas by 17% in 2009. In 2011, Texas had become the first state to surpass the 10,000 MW mark.

On completion in 2016, the Los Vientos Wind Farm became Texas's most powerful wind farm with a total installed capacity of 912 MW. It is spread out over two counties in South Texas. It is followed by the Roscoe Wind Farm with 627 wind turbines and a total installed capacity of 781.5 MW which is located about 200 miles (320 km) west of Fort Worth in an area that spans parts of four Texas counties. The Horse Hollow Wind Energy Center is third with 735.5 MW. By 2016 Texas surpassed the 20,000 MW mark by adding over 1800 MW of generating capacity in 2016 alone, including Los Vientos.

Iowa 

More than 57 percent of the electric power generated in Iowa now comes from wind power as of February 2021. Iowa had over 10,950 megawatts (MW) of generation capacity at the end of 2020, with over 1,500 megawatts planned to come online in the near future. Electrical energy generated in Iowa by wind in 2020 amounted to over 34 million Megawatt-hours. Since Iowa adopted a renewable energy standard in 1983, the wind power industry has generated over $19 billion in investment. The second concrete wind turbine tower to be built in the U.S., and also the country's tallest (377 feet) at the time built, is in Adams county. The tower was completed in the spring of 2016.

In 2018, Invenergy announced it plans to develop a pair of wind farms in Iowa. Each farm will be capable of generating 200 MW. Construction is planned to begin in early 2019.

Oklahoma 

Oklahoma has one of the best resources in the United States. Bergey Windpower, a leading manufacturer of small wind turbines is located in Oklahoma. Programs leading to careers in the wind power industry are provided at tech schools, community colleges and universities in Oklahoma. The Oklahoma Wind Power Initiative supports the development of wind power in the state.

Kansas 

In 2012, Kansas saw a large number of wind projects completed making it among the largest and fastest-growing wind energy markets. At the end of 2014 the total capacity sits at 2,967 MW.
Kansas has high potential capacity for wind power, second behind Texas. The most recent estimates are that Kansas has a potential for 950 GW of wind power capacity. Kansas could generate 3,900 TW·h of electric power each year, which represents more than all the electric power generated from coal, natural gas and nuclear combined in the United States in 2011.

California 

With nearly 4,000 megawatts installed, as of the end of 2011, wind energy supplied about 5% of California's total electric power needs, or enough to power more than 400,000 households. The amount varies greatly from day to day. In 2011, 921.3 megawatts were installed. Most of that activity occurred in the Tehachapi area of Kern County, with some big projects in Solano, Contra Costa and Riverside counties as well. After 2014, California ranked second nationwide in terms of capacity, behind Texas with a capacity of 5,917 MW.

Large portions of California's wind output, are located in three primary regions: Altamont Pass Wind Farm (east of San Francisco); Tehachapi Pass Wind Farm (south east of Bakersfield), and San Gorgonio Pass Wind Farm (near Palm Springs, east of Los Angeles). The giant new Alta Wind Energy Center, is also located within the Tehachapi Pass region.

Illinois 

Wind power has been supported by a renewable portfolio standard, passed in 2007, and strengthened in 2009, which requires 10% renewable energy from electric companies by 2010 and 25% by 2025. Illinois has the potential for installing up to an estimated 249,882 MW of wind generation capacity at a hub height of 80 meters.

Commercialization of wind power

Industry trends 

Since 2005 many turbine manufacturing leaders have opened U.S. facilities; of the top 10 global manufacturers in 2007, seven – Vestas, GE Energy, Gamesa, Suzlon, Siemens, Acciona, and Nordex – have an American manufacturing presence. REpower is another manufacturer with notable usage in the United States.

Plans for 30 new manufacturing facilities were announced in 2008, and the wind industry expects to see a continued shift towards domestic manufacturing in the coming years. In total, 70 manufacturing facilities have begun production, been expanded, or announced since January 2007.

As of April 2009, over 100 companies are producing components for wind turbines, employing thousands of workers in the manufacture of parts as varied as towers, composite blades, bearings and gears. Many existing companies in traditional manufacturing states have retooled to enter the wind industry. Their manufacturing facilities are spread across 40 states, employing workers from the Southeast to the Steel Belt, to the Great Plains and on to the Pacific Northwest.

The U.S. Department of Energy (DOE) is working with six leading wind turbine manufacturers towards achieving 20% wind power in the United States by 2030. The DOE announced the Memorandum of Understanding (MOU) with GE Energy, Siemens Power Generation, Vestas Wind Systems, Clipper Windpower, Suzlon Energy, and Gamesa Corporation. Under the MOU, the DOE and the six manufacturers will collaborate to gather and exchange information relating to five major areas: research and development related to turbine reliability and operability; siting strategies for wind power facilities; standards development for turbine certification and universal interconnection of wind turbines; manufacturing advances in design, process automation, and fabrication techniques; and workforce development.

In 2014, GE had 60%, Siemens had 26%, and Vestas had 12% of US market share. Combined, they had 98%. Most new turbines were designed for low wind. The turbine manufacturers compete with each other and cause decreasing turbine prices.

Other government involvement 

The DOE's National Renewable Energy Laboratory (NREL) has announced a number of wind technology projects, including a new state-of-the-art wind turbine blade test facility to be built in Ingleside, Texas. The Texas-NREL Large Blade Research and Test Facility will be capable of testing blades as long as 70 meters (230 feet). It will be built and operated through a partnership among NREL, DOE, and a state consortium led by University of Houston, with the university owning and operating the facility's buildings, DOE funding up to $2 million in capital costs, and NREL providing technical and operational assistance. The blade test facility is estimated to cost between $12 million and $15 million and should be completed by 2010. Located on the Gulf Coast, the Texas facility will complement a similar facility that is being built on the coast of Massachusetts.

NREL has also recently signed agreements with Siemens Power Generation and First Wind, a wind power developer. Siemens is launching a new research and development facility in nearby Boulder, Colorado, and has agreed to locate and test a commercial-scale wind turbine at NREL's National Wind Technology Center (NWTC). First Wind (formerly called UPC Wind Partners, LLC) owns and operates the 30-megawatt Kaheawa Wind Power farm in West Maui, Hawaii, and has agreed to let the NWTC establish a Remote Research Affiliate Partner Site at the facility. The Maui satellite of NWTC will collaborate with First Wind on studies to develop advanced wind energy technologies, including energy storage and integration of renewable electric power into Maui's electrical grid.

In 2010, the DOE awarded $60 million for a study of transmission requirements. Beginning in 2006, the DOE is required to provide a transmission congestion report once every three years.

Recent U.S. policy has generally been to provide an inflation-adjusted federal production tax credit (PTC) of $15 per MW·h (in 1995 dollars) generated for the first ten years of operation for wind energy sold. As of 2015, the credit was $23 per MW·h. Renewable portfolio standards mandating a certain percentage of electric power sales come from renewable energy sources, which are in place in about half of the states, also have boosted the development of the wind industry.

Each time Congress has allowed the production tax credit to expire, wind power development has slowed as investors wait for the credit to be restored. Each year it is renewed, development has expanded. The tax credit expired at the end of 2012, bringing wind power development activity to a near halt. A short term, one-year policy was enacted at the beginning of 2013 which provides a tax credit to projects under construction by the end of 2013 and completed before the end of 2014. The PTC was first introduced in 1992. When it was allowed to expire, development dropped 93%, 73%, and 77% the following year.

The Energy Information Administration has reported that wind power received the largest share of direct federal subsidies and support in fiscal year 2013 (the latest year for which statistics are available), accounting for 37% ($5.936 billion) of total electric power-related subsidies. Almost three-quarters of wind energy subsidies in that year were direct expenditures and largely resulted from the ARRA programs. These figures do not include subsidies and supports from other levels of government.

The development of wind power in the United States has been supported primarily through a production tax credit (PTC), which pays producers on the amount of electric power produced. On January 1, 2013, the production tax credit was extended for another year.

In late 2015 authorities provided an extension of the Production Tax Credit. The extension phases out the credit over a period of five years. The 30 percent wind and solar tax credit will extend through 2019 and then taper to 10 percent in 2022.

The average price of Power purchase agreements was $23.5/MWh in 2014. Operating expenses were estimated to $10/MWh.

Siting considerations 

There is competition for wind farms among farmers in places like Iowa or ranchers in Colorado. Farmers, with no investment on their part, typically receive $3,000–5,000 per year in royalties from the local utility for siting a single, large, advanced-design wind turbine.

Landscape and ecological issues may be significant for some wind farm proposals, and environmental issues are a consideration in site selection.

Worldwide experience has shown that community consultation and direct involvement of the general public in wind farm projects has helped to increase community approval, and some wind farms overseas have become tourist attractions, like the Ten Mile Lagoon Wind Farm.

Offshore wind power 

Offshore development is hindered by relatively high cost compared to onshore facilities. Several projects are under development with some at advanced stages of development. The United States, though, has very large offshore wind energy resources due to strong, consistent winds off the long U.S. coastline.

The 2011 NREL report, Large-Scale Offshore Wind Power in the United States, analyzes the current state of the offshore wind energy industry. According to the report, offshore wind resource development would help the country to achieve 20% of its electric power from wind by 2030 and to revitalize the manufacturing sector. Offshore wind could supply 54 gigawatts of capacity to the nation's electrical grid, thereby increasing energy security. It could also generate an estimated $200 billion in new economic activity and create thousands of permanent jobs. NREL's report concludes that "the development of the nation's offshore wind resources can provide many potential benefits, and that offshore wind energy could play a vital role in future U.S. energy markets".

Coastal residents have opposed offshore wind farms because of fears about impacts on marine life, the environment, electric power rates, aesthetics, and recreation such as fishing and boating. However, residents also cite improved electric power rates, air quality, and job creation as positive impacts they would expect from wind farms. Because the bases of offshore turbines function as artificial reefs, studies have shown that after the initial disturbance of construction, local fish and shellfish are positively affected. Because wind turbines can be positioned at some distance from shore, impacts to recreation and fishing can be managed by careful planning of wind farm locations.

Five exploratory leases for wind power production on the Outer Continental Shelf offshore from New Jersey and Delaware were issued in June 2009 by the Secretary of the Interior. Four areas were being considered. On February 7, 2011, Salazar and Steven Chu announced a national strategy to have offshore wind power of 10 GW in 2020, and 54 GW in 2030. In 2021 the Biden Administration announced a target of 30 GW of offshore wind by 2030.

Projects are under development in areas of the East coast, West coast, and Gulf coast.

New England 

Rhode Island and Massachusetts state officials picked Deepwater Wind to build a $1.5-billion, 385-megawatt wind farm in federal waters off Block Island. The 100-turbine project could provide 1.3 terawatt-hours (TW·h) of electric power per year – 15 percent of all electric power used in the state of Rhode Island. In 2009, Deepwater signed an agreement with National Grid to sell the power from a smaller $200-million, 30-MW wind farm off Block Island, at an initial price of 24.4 ¢/kW·h. Construction of the Block Island Wind Farm, a five turbine project began in April 2015 and was completed in December 2016 to become the first offshore wind farm in the United States.

Cape Wind started development around 2002, but faced opposition and eventually ceased before being realized. The floating VolturnUS operated in Penobscot Bay near Castine from June 2013 to November 2014. Maine Aqua Ventus intends to have an 11 MW floating turbine in operation off the coast of Monhegan Island by the end of 2023.

Construction began on the 804 MW  Vineyard Wind off-shore project on November 18, 2021, after a long fight for approval. A second large offshore project, Mayflower Wind, is in development.

Mid Atlantic 
To promote wind power in New Jersey, in 2007 the state awarded a $4.4 million contract to conduct an 18-month Ocean/Wind Power Ecological Baseline Study, becoming the first state to sponsor an ocean and wind power study before allowing renewable energy developers to study and build off its shores. The study focused on a designated area off the coast to determine the current distribution, abundance and migratory patterns of avian species, fish, marine resources and sea turtle use of the existing ecological resources. The results of the study were released in June 2010. The study concluded that the effects of developing offshore windfarms would be negligible.

In 2008, new federal rules greatly expanded the territory offshore wind parks can be built. Previously, projects were only allowed in shallow state waters within  of shore. The edge of U.S. territory is about  out. Increased distance from the coast diminishes their visibility. Waters off the coast of the United States are deeper than in Europe, requiring different designs.

If built it will be the largest in the U.S. In September 2020, New Jersey officials halted the Ørsted Ocean Wind Project citing concerns about misrepresented economic benefits of offshore wind, including construction of monopoles, utilization of women- and minority-owned businesses, union labor, possible negative effects on the fishing industry.

Coastal Virginia Offshore Wind (CVOW) is an offshore wind energy pilot project located about 27 miles (43 km) off the coast of Virginia Beach, Virginia. The two-turbine, 12-MW pilot project, constructed in 2020, is the second utility scale offshore wind farm operating in the United States. Dominion Energy and Ørsted US Offshore Wind collaborated on the project.

Wind energy meteorology 

Winds in the Central Plains region of the U.S. are variable on both short (minutes) and long (days) time scales. Variations in wind speed result in variations in power output from wind farms, which poses difficulties incorporating wind power into an integrated power system. Wind turbines are driven by boundary layer winds, those that occur near the surface of the earth, at around 300 feet. Boundary layer winds are controlled by wind in the higher free atmosphere and have turbulence due to interaction with surface features such as trees, hills, and buildings. Short term or high frequency variations are due to this turbulence in the boundary layer.

Long term variations are due to the passage of transient waves in the atmosphere, with a characteristic time scale of several days. The transient waves that influence wind in the Central U.S. are large scale and this results in the power output from wind farms in the region being somewhat correlated and not entirely independent. Large scale distribution of wind farms significantly reduce short term variability, limiting the relative standard deviation of the capacity factor to about 45%. The correlation is highest in summer and lowest in winter.

Environmental impacts and regulations

Bird protection 
The US federal government has jurisdiction to prevent bird and bat deaths by wind turbines, under the Endangered Species Act, the Migratory Bird Treaty Act, and the Bald and Golden Eagle Protection Act. Under the 2009 Bald and Golden Eagle Protection Act, the Interior Department could issue permits to allow "non-purposeful take" for activities where eagle deaths were considered unavoidable; however, as of December 2013, no take permits had been issued to wind energy developers.
The United States Fish and Wildlife Service has published voluntary guidelines for design and siting of wind turbines to minimize bird and bat deaths.

In 2013, the Obama administration was accused of having a double standard to protect the wind industry from Bald and Golden Eagle Protection Act prosecutions, while vigorously pursuing violations by oil companies and owners of power lines. The administration refused to divulge the number of raptor deaths reported to it by wind companies, saying that to do so would reveal trade secrets. The government also ordered federal law enforcement field agents not to pursue bird-death prosecutions against wind companies without prior approval from Washington. The policy was said to be an environmental trade-off to promote renewable energy.

In November 2013, the federal government obtained its first criminal conviction of a wind power operator for killing protected birds in violation of the 1918 Migratory Bird Treaty Act. Duke Energy plead guilty, and was fined $1 million, for the deaths of 160 birds, including 14 golden eagles, at two wind farms in Wyoming. The Justice Department charged that Duke had designed and sited the turbines knowing that they would kill birds; Duke noted that it had self-reported the bird deaths, and that US Fish and Wildlife Service guidelines for reducing bird deaths by wind turbines had not been issued when the turbines were built. After they were charged, Duke implemented a radar detection system, at a cost of $600,000 per year, designed to turn off turbines when approached by large birds; the company noted that the system was working, as no golden eagle deaths had been observed in more than a year of operation since the radar was installed.

In December 2013 the US Fish and Wildlife Service announced that it would issue 30-year permits to wind energy projects to allow for eagle deaths; previously, permits had been available for only 5 years, but none were issued to wind projects. Under the 30-year permits, wind power developers would be required to report eagle deaths, and the permits would be reviewed every 5 years. The measure was intended to remove what was seen as legal uncertainty discouraging wind energy investments. The government said that an environmental review was not needed for the change, because it was only an administrative change. The new regulation was welcomed by the American Wind Energy Association, which said that wind power caused less than two percent of human-caused eagle fatalities, and pointed out that the rules would require extensive mitigation and monitoring of eagle deaths. The extension of eagle taking permits from 5 to 30 years was opposed by a number of conservation groups, including the American Bird Conservancy, the Nature Conservancy, the Sierra Club, the Audubon Society, and the Humane Society of the United States.

More than 30,000 wind turbine locations are within federally protected bird habitats, out of which almost 24,000 lie in the migratory corridor of the whooping crane and almost 3000 in the breeding grounds of the endangered greater sage-grouse.
According to Dr. Michael Hutchins, the director of the American Bird Conservancy's Bird Smart Wind Energy Campaign, wind turbines present a threat to the nation's birds, and that the present permitting process is ineffective in addressing the issue. Concern about the bird deaths prompted the American Bird Conservancy and 70 other conservation organizations, to lobby the U.S. Department of Interior to develop a National Programmatic Wind Environmental impact statement which would identify appropriate areas for wind energy development, as well as areas where development should be avoided, but these lobbying efforts failed. Tom Vinson, the American Wind Energy Association vice president for regulatory affairs noted the ambiguity in estimation and extrapolation of various data and also questioned the credibility of the assumptions of organizations such as American Bird Conservancy in estimating future bird deaths.

Collision risks are primarily influenced by the height of the turbines and tower type. The average death count of birds increases as turbine heights reach 475 to 639 feet. Danger to birds increases because blades at higher altitudes overlap with the average flight height of nocturnally migrating birds.

Offshore wind 
All offshore wind development requires either federal or state approval and a lease since offshore land is government property.  Offshore wind regulation authority has shifted through several federal agencies since the early 2000s.  Prior to 2005, offshore wind turbine and farm permits were under the jurisdiction of the US Army Corps of Engineers.  In 2005, with the passing of the Energy Policy Act, the Minerals Management Service within the Department of the Interior had authority over wind turbine development on federal waters, like the Outer Continental Shelf, and was responsible for evaluating economic value, potential environmental impacts, and coordinating with federal and state agencies when approving wind power permits. Finally, in 2010, the Minerals Management Service was divided into three agencies, of which the Bureau of Ocean Energy Management is responsible for leasing, permitting, monitoring, and regulating offshore wind energy.

The harassment of any marine mammal species in U.S. waters is a violation of the Marine Mammal Protection Act of 1972 (50 CFR 18).
Offshore wind developers are required to apply for a letter of authorization or Incidental Harassment Authorization with all the pertinent details of the species under potential threat from their offshore activities, the mitigation measures, and monitoring and reporting obligations. Offshore wind projects must also comply with all regulatory obligations contained in the Federally approved State coastal management plan, under the Coastal Zone Management Act of 1972, to keep in check their effect on coastal resources.

Statistics

See also 

 American Wind Energy Association
 List of wind farms in the United States
 Renewable energy in the United States
 Wind ENergy Data & Information (WENDI) Gateway
 Solar power in the United States
 Geothermal energy in the United States
 Biofuel in the United States
 Hydroelectric power in the United States
 Renewable energy by country

References

External links 

 Wind Map
 Wind Energy in the U.S. Factsheet by the University of Michigan's Center for Sustainable Systems
 A New Era for Wind Power in the United States, a 2013 DOE report
 GA Mansoori, N Enayati, LB Agyarko (2016), Energy: Sources, Utilization, Legislation, Sustainability, Illinois as Model State, World Sci. Pub. Co., 

 
Articles containing video clips